Melissa Gira Grant (born 1978) is an American journalist. She is a staff writer at The New Republic and the author of Playing the Whore (Verso, 2014), the extended essay Take This Book (Glass Houses, 2012) and co-editor of the ebook Coming and Crying (Glass Houses, 2010).

Early life
Melissa Gira Grant was born in Boston, Massachusetts. She attended the University of Massachusetts Amherst and at San Francisco State University.

Career 
Grant is a former sex worker who began sex work to pay for being a writer.

Grant was a member of the Exotic Dancers Union and a board member at the Lusty Lady Theater in San Francisco. Grant worked at St. James Infirmary Clinic in San Francisco from 2006 to 2009. Later she was on the staff of Third Wave Foundation, a social justice and feminist foundation in New York.

Writing 
Grant’s writing covers the intersection of sex, politics, and technology. She is the author of Playing the Whore (2014) published by Verso and a staff writer at The New Republic. She previously worked as a contributing writer for Pacific Standard, Village Voice, a reporter at Valleywag and a contributing editor at Jacobin. Grant also has written for the Appeal, the Nation, Pacific Standard, the Village Voice, the Atlantic, Wired, the Guardian, Reason, Glamour, Slate, Jezebel, Rhizome, AlterNet, In These Times, Valleywag and $pread.

Publications

Edited
 

Authored

References

External links
 
 Melissa Gira Grant at The Guardian

1978 births
Living people
American sex workers
American women journalists
Date of birth missing (living people)
San Francisco State University alumni
Sex worker activists in the United States
University of Massachusetts Amherst alumni